In Greek mythology, Doris (/ˈdoʊrɪs/; Δωρίς/Δωρίδος means 'bounty') may refer to two related sea divinities:

 Doris, one of the 3,000 Oceanids, water-nymph daughters of the Titans Oceanus and his sister-wife Tethys. She was the mother of the Nereids and Nerites by the 'Old Man of the Sea' Nereus.
 Doris, one of the 50 Nereids, sea-nymph daughters of the above Oceanid Doris and the sea god Nereus. Doris and her other sisters appeared to Thetis when she cries out in sympathy for the grief of Achilles for his slain friend Patroclus.
Doris or Oris, one the possible mothers by Poseidon of the Argonaut Euphemus. In some accounts, the latter's mother was variously named as (1) Europe, daughter of the giant Tityos; (2) Mecionice, daughter of either Eurotas or Orion or (4) lastly, Macionassa.

Notes

References 

 Apollodorus, The Library with an English Translation by Sir James George Frazer, F.B.A., F.R.S. in 2 Volumes, Cambridge, MA, Harvard University Press; London, William Heinemann Ltd. 1921. . Online version at the Perseus Digital Library. Greek text available from the same website.
Claudius Aelianus, On the Characteristics of Animals, translated by Alwyn Faber Scholfield (1884-1969), from Aelian, Characteristics of Animals, published in three volumes by Harvard/Heinemann, Loeb Classical Library, 1958. Online version at the Topos Text Project.
 Claudius Aelianus, De Natura Animalium, Latin translation by Friedrich Jacobs in the Frommann edition, Jena, 1832. Latin translation available at Bill Thayer's Web Site
 Claudius Aelianus, De Natura Animalium, Rudolf Hercher. Lipsiae, in aedibus B. G. Teubneri, 1864.  Greek text available at the Perseus Digital Library.
 Gaius Julius Hyginus, Fabulae from The Myths of Hyginus translated and edited by Mary Grant. University of Kansas Publications in Humanistic Studies. Online version at the Topos Text Project.
 Hesiod, Theogony from The Homeric Hymns and Homerica with an English Translation by Hugh G. Evelyn-White, Cambridge, MA.,Harvard University Press; London, William Heinemann Ltd. 1914. Online version at the Perseus Digital Library. Greek text available from the same website.
Homer, The Iliad with an English Translation by A.T. Murray, Ph.D. in two volumes. Cambridge, MA., Harvard University Press; London, William Heinemann, Ltd. 1924. . Online version at the Perseus Digital Library.
 Homer, Homeri Opera in five volumes. Oxford, Oxford University Press. 1920. . Greek text available at the Perseus Digital Library.
Kerényi, Carl, The Gods of the Greeks, Thames and Hudson, London, 1951.
 .

 Nereids
Deities in the Iliad
Characters in the Iliad